Lettieri is an Italian surname. Notable people with the surname include:

Al Lettieri (1928–1975), American actor
Dave Lettieri (born 1964), American cyclist
Gabriel Lettieri (born 1975), Argentine footballer
Gino Lettieri (born 1966), Italian football manager
Mark Lettieri (born c. 1984), American guitarist
Paola Lettieri, British-Italian chemical engineer
Tino Lettieri (born 1957), Italian footballer

Italian-language surnames